Leroy Walks! is the debut album by American jazz bassist Leroy Vinnegar recorded in 1957 and released on the Contemporary label.

Reception
The AllMusic review by Scott Yanow described it as "A fine, straight-ahead session".

Track listing
 "Walk On" (Leroy Vinnegar)8:23
 "Would You Like to Take a Walk?" (Mort Dixon, Billy Rose, Harry Warren)6:52
 "On the Sunny Side of the Street" (Dorothy Fields, Jimmy McHugh)5:37
 "Walkin'" (Richard Carpenter)6:24
 "Walkin' My Baby Back Home" (Fred E. Ahlert, Roy Turk)4:47
 "I'll Walk Alone" (Sammy Cahn, Jule Styne)3:30
 "Walking by the River" (Una Mae Carlisle, Robert Sour)5:33 		  
Recorded in Los Angeles, CA on July 15 (tracks 1 & 4), September 16 (tracks 3, 5 & 6), and September 23 (tracks 2 & 7), 1957

Personnel
Leroy Vinnegarbass
Gerald Wilsontrumpet
Teddy Edwardstenor saxophone
Victor Feldmanvibraphone
Carl Perkinspiano
Tony Bazleydrums

References

Contemporary Records albums
Leroy Vinnegar albums
1958 albums